Roop or ROOP may refer to:

Arts, entertainment, and media
 Roop - Mard Ka Naya Swaroop, Indian television show
 The Roop, a Lithuanian pop rock band

People

With the first name
 Roop Durgapal, Indian actress
 Roop Kanwar (c. 1969–1987), Rajput woman
 Roop Mallik (born 1970), Indian biophysicist
 Roop Rani, Bharatiya Janata Party MLA in the Punjab Legislative Assembly
 Roop Rathod (born 1960), Indian musician
 Roop Singh (1908–1977), Indian hockey player
 Roop Singh (cricketer), Indian cricketer
 Roop Nath Singh Yadav, Indian politician

With the surname
 Bob Roop (born 1942), American wrestler
 Clawson Roop (1888–1972), director of the United States Bureau of the Budget
 George Roop (born 1981), American mixed martial artist
 Isaac Roop (1822–1869), American politician
 Joyce Elaine Roop (1952–1995), American attorney and environmental activist
 Ted Roop (born 1977), Canadian radio personality
 Mrs. Roop, a recurring character in the Disney Channel TV show The Ghost and Molly McGee

Places
 Roop County, Nevada, United States, a former county
 Roop's Mill, a historic grist mill near Westminster, Maryland, United States
 Straupe, a village in the Pārgauja municipality of Latvia, also called Roop

Science and technology
 ROOP (programming language)

See also
 Roope (name)
 Roops